"The Great Commandment" is a song by German synthpop band Camouflage. Originally recorded in 1983, the song was re-recorded in 1987 and released as their debut single in 1987. It was included in their 1988 debut album, Voices & Images. 

The single gave Camouflage their only number one dance hit. "The Great Commandment" stayed at the top spot for three non-consecutive weeks.  The single became popular on independent stations and crossed over to the mainstream American pop charts, peaking at number 59 in February 1989. In their native Germany, "The Great Commandment" went to number 14, and reached the top ten in more than twenty countries.

Music video
The music video depicts the band members amongst a crowd of children, who appear to be protesting against a spokesperson of some kind. One of the children discovers a control panel underneath the stage, and proves that the spokesperson is in fact a robot controlled by the mechanism.

Track listings

The Great Commandment 2.0

In 2001, Camouflage re-recorded their debut single "The Great Commandment" and released it that year as a comeback attempt at their label's suggestion. Vocals were also re-recorded. The single was produced by London trio "Toy" and drums were provided by Christian Eigner, former tourmate of Depeche Mode. It reached number 85 on the charts.

Track listing

References

http://www.myspace.com/volkerbrothers
http://www.discogs.com/Camouflage-The-Great-Commandment/master/7480

1987 songs
1987 debut singles
Camouflage (band) songs
Metronome Records singles
Polydor Records singles
Songs written by Heiko Maile